The Mystic Knights of the Oingo Boingo was an American surrealist street theatre troupe, formed by performer and director Richard Elfman in 1972. The group was led by Richard until 1976, when his brother Danny Elfman took over. The group evolved into an experimental musical theatre group, performing songs from the 1930s-40s and original material.

In 1979, Danny Elfman wished to pursue a new direction as a dedicated rock band and the group reformed as Oingo Boingo. Several Mystic Knights band members continued with the new band including Steve Bartek, Leon Schneiderman, Dale Turner, and Sam 'Sluggo' Phipps.

History
The Mystic Knights of the Oingo Boingo, formed in late 1972 by Richard Elfman, was a musical theater troupe in the tradition of Spike Jones and Frank Zappa, performing an eclectic repertoire ranging from Cab Calloway covers to instrumentals in the style of Balinese gamelan and Russian ballet music. The name was inspired by a fictional secret society on the Amos 'n' Andy TV series called The Mystic Knights of the Sea. Most of the members performed in whiteface and clown makeup, and a typical show contained music ranging from the 1890s to the 1950s, in addition to original material. This version of the band employed as many as 15 musicians at any given time, playing over 30 instruments, including some instruments built by band members. While this group performed live, it did not issue any recordings.

As Richard Elfman's interest shifted to filmmaking, he passed leadership of the band to younger brother Danny, who had recently returned from spending time in Africa playing violin and studying percussion instruments. They gained a following in Los Angeles, and appeared as contestants on The Gong Show in 1976, winning the episode they appeared on with 24 points out of a possible 30. The Gong Show presentation included an accordion, a purple dragon and a gaseous rocket-man. 

Later in 1976, The Mystic Knights of the Oingo Boingo released "You Got Your Baby Back", a doo-wop style novelty single about kidnapped heiress Patty Hearst. Both this track and the B-side "Ballad of the Caveman" were written and sung by Danny Elfman. The band featured in the 1976 Martin Brest film Hot Tomorrows performing the songs "St. James Infirmary" and "42nd Street". 

Richard Elfman produced Forbidden Zone in 1977-78 with a cast mostly comprising band members and friends, later released in 1980. In one scene, Danny, as Satan, sings a version of Calloway's "Minnie the Moocher" with lyrics adapted for the movie plot. In another, Richard sings the 1920s novelty song "The Yiddishe Charleston". The movie attained cult status.

During 1978-79, Danny Elfman was introducing more original songs into the band’s set with a growing rock influence, as the shows became more musical focussed playing theatres and music clubs around Los Angeles. In mid-1979, Danny decided to disband the Mystic Knights to form a dedicated rock band with a new musical style, which shortly became Oingo Boingo.

Discography
 "You Got Your Baby Back" / "Ballad Of The Caveman" (Pelican Records, 1976)

Filmography
I Never Promised You a Rose Garden (1977)
Hot Tomorrows (1977)
Forbidden Zone (1982)

References

Musical groups from Los Angeles
Musical groups established in 1972
Musical groups disestablished in 1979